Gino Talamo (13 December 1895 – 9 July 1968) was an Italian actor, film editor and director. He directed the 1949 Brazilian film Iracema.

Selected filmography

Actor
 Messalina (1924)
 Beatrice Cenci (1926)

Editor
 The Two Sergeants (1936)
 Doctor Antonio (1937)
 I've Lost My Husband! (1937)
 The Last Dance (1941)
 The Peddler and the Lady (1943)
 Romulus and the Sabines (1945)
 Farewell, My Beautiful Naples (1946)
 Lost in the Dark (1947)

Director
 Knights of the Desert (1942)
 Iracema (1949)

References

Bibliography 
 Sadlier, Darlene Joy (ed.) Latin American Melodrama: Passion, Pathos, and Entertainment. University of Illinois Press, 2009.

External links 
 

1895 births
1968 deaths
Italian film editors
Italian film directors
Italian male film actors
Italian male silent film actors
People from Taranto
20th-century Italian male actors